Lobopoda is a genus of comb-clawed beetles in the family Tenebrionidae. The type species is Lobopoda striata. The following subgenera of Lobopoda have been described:

(Lobopoda) Flavipoda Campbell, 1966
(Lobopoda) Glabrilobopoda Campbell, 1966
(Lobopoda) Lobopoda Solier, 1835
(Lobopoda) Mesolobopoda Campbell, 1966
(Lobopoda) Monoloba Solier, 1835

References

Alleculinae